Scott Reeder may refer to:

 Scott Reeder (bassist) (born 1965), American bass guitarist
 Scott Reeder (artist) (born 1970), American artist and filmmaker 
 Scott Reeder (drummer), American drummer